Scot Thompson (born February 11, 1981 in New York, New York) is an American soccer player.

On January 20, 2010 he was ranked 21st in the USL First Division Top 25 of the Decade, which announced a list of the best and most influential players of the previous decade. He was the official community ambassador for the Portland Timbers and involved in social media connecting with fans, both Twitter and Facebook, for the Timbers.

Career

Youth and College
Thompson grew up in Rancho Santa Margarita, California, and was a standout defender at Trabuco Hills High School from 1995 to 1999, where he was a four-year Varsity starter, and earned all South Coast League 1st Team Honors for three years. During this time, Thompson was invited to train with the US National Under-19 Squad. In Thompson's senior year the Mustangs earned a share of the South Coast League title and were knocked out of the quarter-finals of the CIF playoffs.

Thompson played college soccer at UCLA from 1999 to 2002, helping lead the Bruins to a national championship in 2002. He finished his career at UCLA with 68 starts, and was named to the first-team All-Pac-10 as a senior.

Professional
Thompson was selected in the second round (16th overall) in the 2003 MLS SuperDraft by Los Angeles Galaxy. Unfortunately for Thompson, he tore his ACL in the preseason, and missed the entire 2003 season as a result. Returning healthy in 2004, Thompson was nevertheless unable to break into the Galaxy's starting lineup - he was loaned mid-season to the Portland Timbers of the A-League, where he excelled. Thompson started 13 games for the team, registering two assists, while helping lead the team to the A-League's best regular season record.  When the Timbers were eliminated from the playoffs, Thompson returned to the Galaxy; however, he only made one appearance, playing a single minute.

Thompson was released at the end of the season and, despite professing intentions of going to Europe, re-signed with the Timbers. In July 2005, Thompson put in an impressive performance for the Timbers in a friendly match against English soccer team Sunderland, which had been recently promoted to the English Premier League. He was invited to participate in a several week training session with Sunderland later in 2005, although he was not offered a contract with the club. History repeated itself in 2006: after an impressive performance in an exhibition match against English soccer team Coventry City, he was invited to a 10-day trial training session in August.

Thompson became the Timbers all-time leader in minutes on July 23, 2009. On February 26, 2010 Portland announced the re-signing of Thompson to a new contract for the 2010 season.

After a particularly noteworthy play, his fans in Portland routinely chant "S-C-O-T, Scot with One T!"

Coaching
On March 7, 2014, Portland Thorns FC announced Thompson had been hired as an assistant coach for the 2014-2015 season.

Honors

Portland Timbers
USL First Division Commissioner's Cup (1): 2009

References

External links
 Portland Timbers bio

1981 births
Living people
American soccer players
Association football defenders
LA Galaxy draft picks
LA Galaxy players
Major League Soccer players
Sportspeople from Mission Viejo, California
Soccer players from New York City
Portland Timbers (2001–2010) players
Portland Timbers U23s players
Soccer players from California
UCLA Bruins men's soccer players
A-League (1995–2004) players
USL First Division players
USSF Division 2 Professional League players
USL League Two players
United States men's under-23 international soccer players
Portland Thorns FC non-playing staff